The  1957–58 season was Manchester United's 56th in the Football League, and their 13th consecutive season in the top division of English football.

The season marked the biggest tragedy in the club's history as eight players, three club officials and ten other passengers died as a result of their injuries in the Munich air disaster on 6 February 1958 on their way back from a European Cup quarter-final away to Red Star Belgrade. Centre-half Mark Jones, captain Roger Byrne, full-back Geoff Bent, winger David Pegg, right-half Eddie Colman, inside-right Bill Whelan and centre-forward Tommy Taylor were all killed instantly. Left-half Duncan Edwards was in hospital for two weeks before he too died on 21 February.

Winger Johnny Berry and centre-half Jackie Blanchflower were both injured to such an extent that they never played again, while several of the surviving players were unavailable for a considerable amount of time as they recovered from their injuries.

Manager Matt Busby was badly injured, and his assistant Jimmy Murphy (who was not on that fateful flight) took charge of the first team until the end of the season as Busby recovered from his injuries. Club secretary Walter Crickmer and coaches Tom Curry and Bert Whalley were all killed in the crash, which claimed a total of 23 lives.

Despite the decimation of their squad, a makeshift United side still managed to reach the FA Cup final that season, where they lost to Bolton Wanderers. They also reached the semi-finals of the European Cup. However, their league form suffered after the crash and their title challenge faded as they finished ninth in the final table. At the time of the crash, their record was (P-28, W-15, D-6, L-7, points 36). After the crash, the record was (P-14, 1+5+8, 7 points) as they dropped 21 points, and they finished 21 points behind the league champions Wolves. Since they were winning only 50% of their games before the crash, it can be reasonably said that the crash did not cost them the title.  

With the United squad decimated by death and injuries in the aftermath of the Munich tragedy, a number of younger players broke through into the first team. These included winger Shay Brennan and forward Mark Pearson. Another notable new member of the side was goalkeeper Harry Gregg, signed in December 1957 a few weeks before the Munich crash, and who was hailed a hero for his rescue efforts in the crash.

United's top scorer for the season was Dennis Viollet, who found the net 23 times in all competitions and 16 times in the league despite being out of action for some two months as he recovered from injuries sustained in the Munich crash.

FA Charity Shield

First Division

FA Cup

European Cup

Squad statistics

Munich air disaster

On 5 February 1958, United played Red Star Belgrade in Yugoslavia, in the second leg of the European Cup quarter finals. The match ended in a 3–3 draw, but as United had already won the home leg 2–1, they won the tie 5–4 on aggregate and reached the semi finals for the second year in succession.

The team's chartered plane, an Airspeed Ambassador owned by British European Airways, left Belgrade on 6 February and stopped at Munich to refuel. Takeoff had to be aborted twice because of boost surging, a common problem in the "Elizabethan". The problem was caused by the fuel mixture being too rich, which caused the engines to over-accelerate: this problem was exacerbated by the altitude of the Munich airport.

The pilots were able to control the surging on the third takeoff attempt, but as they reached the V1 "decision speed" (after which it is unsafe to abort takeoff), the airspeed suddenly dropped. The aircraft left the runway, crashed through a fence and into a house. The left wing and the tail were ripped off, while the starboard side of the fuselage hit a fuel tank and exploded. Officially, the cause of the accident was build-up of slush on the runway, which caused the aircraft to lose speed, preventing it from achieving takeoff.

Mark Jones, David Pegg, Roger Byrne (United's captain since 1953), Geoff Bent, Eddie Colman, Liam Whelan, and Tommy Taylor were killed outright, in addition to club secretary Walter Crickmer, and coaches Tom Curry and Bert Whalley. Duncan Edwards, Matt Busby, and Johnny Berry were critically injured; Edwards died fifteen days later. Berry and Jackie Blanchflower survived but never played again. Byrne, Taylor and Edwards were all regular members of the England team, with 70 caps and 21 goals between them, while Pegg, Whelan, Berry and Blanchflower had all received full international recognition for England, the Republic of Ireland or Northern Ireland.

A total of 23 people died as a result of their injuries; among them were four other passengers and two of the crew, as were eight sportswriters including former Manchester City and England goalkeeper Frank Swift. Among the survivors were goalkeeper Harry Gregg, who had only just joined the club from Doncaster Rovers, full-back Bill Foulkes and forward Bobby Charlton.

References

Manchester United F.C. seasons
Manchester United